Low Dinsdale is a village and former civil parish in the borough of Darlington and the ceremonial county of 
County Durham, England. The Parish population taken at the 2011 census was 871. It is situated a few miles to the south-east of Darlington.

Historically the village was commonly known as Dinsdale.  "Low" was added to distinguish the village from the neighbouring village of Over Dinsdale, on the opposite bank of the River Tees in North Yorkshire.  The toponym was recorded in Domesday Book as Dignesale and Dirneshale, and recorded in 1088 as Detnisale.  The name is Old English and means either "nook of land belonging to a man named Dyttin" or "nook of land belonging to Deighton".  Deighton was in the same wapentake (Allerton) as Over Dinsdale.

Listed buildings include Low Dinsdale Manor and Dinsdale Park a former Spa hotel.

References 

Villages in County Durham
Places in the Borough of Darlington
Places in the Tees Valley
Former civil parishes in County Durham